Co-op Academy Grange is a coeducational secondary school located in south Bradford, West Yorkshire, England.

History

Grammar school
The school was originally known as Grange High School, becoming Grange Boys' Grammar School and Grange Girls' Grammar School.

Comprehensive
It became a comprehensive school.

Academy
Grange Technology college became an academy in 2013. The college went through a transitional period in 2011 where it moved to a new advanced facility managed by Amey, the investment reportedly costing around 50 million pounds. The transition oversaw the conjoining of two educational institutes into what is now Southfield Grange, Southfield school and Grange Technology College now both exist as Co-op academies now having joined the Co-op Academies Trust recently in 2019.

Admissions
It is currently over-subscribed and serves over 1,850 pupils (with over 300 in the sixth form) from a wide variety of ethnic backgrounds. The majority of pupils are of South Asian heritage. The current (2016) headteacher is Ms Mander.

In November 2011 Ofsted rated the school as a "good school with outstanding features."

Facilities
In June 2011 Grange moved into their new building which is shared by Southfield Special School. The name of both schools were combined to create the campus known as Southfield Grange.

Notable former pupils

Grange Boys' Grammar School
 Stanley Ellis (linguist)
 Edward Petherbridge, actor, married to the actress Emily Richard
 Peter Harrison (rugby player)
 Arthur Tiley CBE, Conservative MP from 1955 to 1966 for Bradford West
 Frank Whitcombe Jr, rugby player

Grange Girls' Grammar School
 Billie Whitelaw CBE, actress

Grange Upper School
 Tasmin Archer, musician known for 1992 Sleeping Satellite

References

External links
 Grange Technology College

Secondary schools in the City of Bradford
Schools in Bradford
Academies in the City of Bradford